Statistics of Swiss Super League in the 1936–37 season.

Overview
It was contested by 13 teams, and Grasshopper Club Zürich won the championship.

League standings

Results

Sources 
 Switzerland 1936-37 at RSSSF

Nationalliga seasons
Swiss
Football